Sue Hecht (born December 7, 1947) is an American politician from Maryland and a member of the Democratic Party. She retired in 2011 after serving three terms in the Maryland House of Delegates, representing Maryland's District 3A in Frederick County. She is known for her campaign slogan "Hecht Yes!".

Biography
Hecht was born in Takoma Park, Maryland on December 7, 1947. She attended Frederick Community College, Hood College, and Frostburg State University, where she earned her MBA before becoming an adjunct professor at Frostburg State University, a freelance writer, and executive director of a non-profit organization. Hecht has received numerous awards for her work, including being included in a list of Maryland's top 100 women.

Election results
2006 Race for Maryland House of Delegates – District 3A
Voters to choose two:
{| class="wikitable"
|-
!Name
!Votes
!Percent
!Outcome
|-
|-
|Galen R. Clagett, Dem.
|12,422
|  25.7%
|   Won
|-
|-
|Sue Hecht, Dem.
|13,900
|  28.7%
|   Won
|-
|-
|Patrick N. Hogan, Rep.
|12,163
|  25.1%
|   Lost
|-
|-
|Linda Naylor, Rep.
|9,873
|  20.4%
|   Lost
|-
|Other Write-Ins
|32
|  0.1%
|   Lost
|-
|}
2002 Race for Maryland State Senate – District 3
{| class="wikitable"
|-
!Name
!Votes
!Percent
!Outcome
|-
|- 
|Alex X. Mooney, Rep.
|21,617 
|  55.0%
|   Won
|-
|- 
|C. Sue Hecht, Dem.
|17,654
|  44.9%
|   Lost
|-
|Other Write-Ins
|66
|  0.2%
|   Lost
|}
1998 election for Maryland House of Delegates – District 3
Voters to choose three:
{| class="wikitable"
!Name
!Votes
!Percent
!Outcome
|-
|-
|-
|Louise Virginia Snodgrass, Rep.
|19,196
|  21%
|   Won
|-
|-
|C. Sue Hecht, Dem.
|17,968
|  19%
|   Won
|-
|-
|Joseph R. Bartlett, Rep.
|15,784
|  17%
|   Won
|-
|-
|William M. Castle, Rep.
|15,251
|  17%
|   Lost
|-
|-
|Richard L. Stup, Dem.
|13,191
|  14%
|   Lost
|-
|-
|David P. Koontz, Dem.
|10,858
|  12%
|   Lost
|}
1994 election for Maryland House of Delegates – District 3
Voters to choose three:
{| class="wikitable"
!Name
!Votes
!Percent
!Outcome
|-
|-
|-
|J. Anita Stup, Rep.
|20,262
|  25%
|   Won
|-
|-
|Louise Virginia Snodgrass, Rep.
|14,071
|  17%
|   Won
|-
|-
|C. Sue Hecht, Dem.
|12,700
|  15%
|   Won
|-
|-
|Ronald L. Sundergill, Dem.
|12,466
|  15%
|   Lost
|-
|-
|Melvin L. Castle, Rep.
|12,227
|  15%
|   Lost
|-
|-
|Royd Smith, Dem.
|10,810
|  13%
|   Lost
|}

Legislative Notes
 voted for the Maryland Gang Prosecution Act of 2007 (HB713), subjecting gang members to up to 20 years in prison and/or a fine of up to $100,000
 voted for Jessica's Law (HB 930), eliminating parole for the most violent child sexual predators and creating a mandatory minimum sentence of 25 years in state prison, 2007
 voted for Public Safety – Statewide DNA Database System – Crimes of Violence and Burglary – Post conviction (HB 370), helping to give police officers and prosecutors greater resources to solve crimes and eliminating a backlog of 24,000 unanalyzed DNA samples, leading to 192 arrests, 2008
 voted for Vehicle Laws – Repeated Drunk and Drugged Driving Offenses – Suspension of License (HB 293), strengthening Maryland's drunk driving laws by imposing a mandatory one year license suspension for a person convicted of drunk driving more than once in five years, 2009
 voted for HB 102, creating the House Emergency Medical Services System Workgroup, leading to Maryland's budgeting of $52 million to fund three new Medevac helicopters to replace the State's aging fleet, 2009

For the past four years, Delegate Hecht has annually voted to support classroom teachers, public schools, police and hospitals in Frederick County. Since 2002, funding to schools across the State has increased 82%, resulting in Maryland being ranked top in the nation for K-12 education.

Notes

References

Democratic Party members of the Maryland House of Delegates
Living people
1947 births
Hood College alumni
Frostburg State University alumni
Women state legislators in Maryland
21st-century American politicians
21st-century American women politicians